Chilo mesoplagalis is a moth in the family Crambidae. It was described by George Hampson in 1919. It is found in Nigeria, Sierra Leone and Uganda.

References

Chiloini
Moths described in 1919